Belavah (also Romanized as Belāvah Tareh-ye Soflá; also known as Belāveh Tareh) is a city in the Zagros District of Chardavol County, Ilam Province, Iran. At the 2006 census, its population was 290, in 63 families. The city was upgraded from a village and was chosen to be the capital city of Zagros District which was established on June 30, 2013, on the same date. The city is populated by Kurds.

References 

Cities in Ilam Province
Populated places in Chardavol County
Kurdish settlements in Ilam Province